A Espuma das Canções (The Foam of Songs) is the ninth studio album by Rui Veloso. It was released in November 2005 through EMI. The album was recorded in Vale de Lobos (Sintra), London and Rio de Janeiro. 

Two editions were released for the album: a regular edition and a special limited edition with two bonus songs and a DVD with a film and photo galleries covering the making of the album.

Track listing

Special Limited Edition

Charts 
Weekly charts

References

External links
moo.pt 
Interview with Rui Veloso on the album A Espuma das Canções 

Rui Veloso albums
2005 albums